, known as simply Tetsujin 28 in international releases, is a 1956 manga written and illustrated by Mitsuteru Yokoyama, who also created Giant Robo. The series centers on the adventures of a young boy named Shotaro Kaneda, who controls a giant robot named Tetsujin 28, built by his late father.

The manga was later adapted into four anime television series, a Japanese television drama and two films, one live action and one animated. Released in 1963, the first series was among the first Japanese anime series to feature a giant robot. It was later released in the United States as Gigantor. A live-action movie with heavy use of CGI was produced in Japan in 2005.

The series is credited with featuring the first humanoid giant robot controlled externally via remote control by an operator.

Plot

In the final phase of the Pacific War, the Imperial Japanese Army were developing a gigantic robot "Tetsujin 28-go" as the secret weapon to fight against the Allies. However, Japan surrendered before they could complete its construction. After the war, Dr. Kaneda (the developer of Tetsujin 28-go) passed his robot to his son Shotaro Kaneda.

Characters
: The ten-year-old son of Dr. Kaneda. He is Tetsujin's assigned controller, with a deep emotional attachment to the robot. Shotaro is a boy detective famous throughout Tokyo, and in the manga, 1963 series, and 2004 series, can be seen frequently driving a car.
: Dr. Kaneda's assistant, later Shotaro's mentor and guardian. He is caring and very dedicated to his work, but usually looks serious and deadpan. He is married, and has a son named Tetsuo.
: The Chief of Tokyo Police. He is warm in personality and very enthusiastic, which isn't to say he doesn't take his job seriously. He is very close to Shikishima and also takes care of Shotaro, even acting as a surrogate father in the 2004 series.
: A former intelligence officer who begins to help Otsuka and Shotaro's work. His appearances in the 1960s and 2004 series are starkly different; he is immediately Shotaro's ally in the 1960s, but in the 2004 series, his brothers Ryuusaku and Tatsu are killed during Tetsujin's revival, causing him to seek revenge for several episodes. In the original manga, he and Ryuusaku are the leaders of a criminal organization.
: A reclusive mad scientist who created the robot Black Ox. He is calm and very knowledgeable, but unfortunately uses his talents to create dangerous robots. In the original version of the 1960s series, his name is Dr. Black Dog.
: An American man who volunteered himself to be turned into an android as part of a wartime experiment. As a result, his body is entirely robotic with the exception of his brain, and is often covered in bandages. In the 2004 series, he steals his brother Johnson's identity in order to kill the doctor that made him this way.

Production
Yokoyama's Tetsujin, much like Osamu Tezuka's Astro Boy, was influenced by the artist's wartime experiences. In Yokoyama's case, this was through the bombing of Kobe in World War II.

As he had written in Ushio magazine in 1995, "When I was a fifth-grader, the war ended and I returned home from Tottori Prefecture, where I had been evacuated. The city of Kobe had been totally flattened, reduced to ashes. People said it was because of the B-29 bombers...as a child, I was astonished by their terrifying, destructive power." Another influence on Tetsujin's creation was the Vergeltungswaffen, a set of wonder weapons designed for long-range strategic bombing during World War II, and the idea that Nazi Germany possessed an "ace in the hole to reverse [its] waning fortunes". The third work to inspire Yokoyama's creation was the 1931 film Frankenstein, which shaped Yokoyama's belief that the monster itself is neither good or evil.

Release
Tetsujin 28-go was serialized in Kobunsha's Shōnen magazine from July 1956 to May 1966, for a total of 97 chapters. The series was collected into 12 tankōbon volumes, which are re-released every ten years.

Adaptations

1963 television series

The 1963 television incarnation of Tetsujin 28-go aired on Fuji TV from 20 October 1963 to 25 May 1966. The series initially ended with 84 episodes, but then returned for 13 more, for a total of 97 episodes. The series had mostly short plots that never took up more than three episodes, but was generally more light-hearted than the anime that would succeed it. Shotaro, Otsuka, Shikishima and Murasame functioned as a team in this version.

In North America due to the Marvel Comics character Iron Man appearing in that market before Tetsujin 28-go (which literally means "Iron Man No. 28") debuted there, so the series was renamed Gigantor for the American version. The dub was done by Fred Ladd, all of the character names were changed, and the wartime setting removed.  Shotaro Kaneda became Jimmy Sparks, Dr. Shikishima became Dr. Bob Brilliant, Inspector Otsuka became Inspector Ignatz J. Blooper, and Kenji Murasame became Dick Strong. The series' setting was pushed forward to the year 2000. Only 52 of the 97 episodes were ever dubbed in English.

1980 television series

The 1980-81 New Tetsujin 28 series was created with 51 color episodes based on a modernized take upon the original concept art. In 1993, Fred Ladd and the TMS animation studio converted the series into The New Adventures of Gigantor and had it broadcast on America's Sci-Fi Channel from September 9, 1993 to June 30, 1997.

Tetsujin 28 FX
Chō Dendō Robo Tetsujin 28-go FX is a sequel to Tetsujin 28-go directed by Tetsuo Imazawa and produced at the Tokyo Movie Shinsha studio. It ran on Nippon Television from April 5, 1992 to March 30, 1993, totaling 47 episodes. It has been brought over to Latin America, but never released in English-speaking countries.

The show follows Shotaro's son, Masato, who controls a new edition of Tetsujin and works at a detective agency with other children. Among them are Shiori Nishina, granddaughter of Chief Otsuka. The Tetsujin FX (Iron Hero 28 Future X) is controlled by a remote control gun, which has to be aimed at the robot for it to take commands.

Cast
 Yusuke Numata as Masato Kaneda
 Hideyuki Tanaka as Shotaro Kaneda (adult)
 Eiko Yamada as Shotaro Kaneda (child)
 Ai Orikasa as Yoko Kaneda
 Fumihiko Tachiki as Ken'ichi Tsukasa
 Etsuko Kozakura as Futaba Mitsue
 Takeshi Kusao as Saburo Natsuki
 Akiko Hiramatsu as Shiori Nishina

2004 television series

Written and directed by Yasuhiro Imagawa, the 2004 remake takes place ten years after World War II, approximately the same time as the manga debuted.  The new television series has been released in the United States under its original name Tetsujin-28 by Geneon and in the United Kingdom by Manga Entertainment, the first time a Tetsujin-28 property has not been localized to "Gigantor" in America or other English speaking nations.  The television series focused mainly on Shotaro's pursuit to control and fully understand Tetsujin's capabilities, all the while encountering previous creations and scientists from the Tetsujin Project.  While not fully based on the original manga, it followed an extremely different storyline than in the 1960s series.

On July 1, 2004, a video game was released for the PlayStation 2 developed by Sandlot and published by Bandai. The game uses the same voice actors as the animation, though it takes presentation cues from the anime, the manga, as well as the kaiju film genre.

On March 31, 2007, a feature-length film, entitled "Tetsujin 28-go: Hakuchu no Zangetsu" (which translates as "Tetsujin #28: The Daytime Moon") was released in Japanese theaters.  The film used the same character designs and scenery as the 2004 television series, albeit the film remade the series from the beginning.  Among the changes, a new character "Shoutarou" debuted, Shotaro's older half-brother who was in the same airforce troop as Ryuusaku Murasame.  Also a character named Tsuki, with a heavily bandaged body, attempts to murder Shotaro.

2005 live-action film

A live-action adaptation of the series, directed by Shin Togashi, was released in Japan on March 19, 2005. It was later released on DVD in the US by Geneon Entertainment and by Manga Entertainment in the UK. The film centers on Shotaro (Sosuke Ikematsu), who is living in the modern age with his widowed mother. He discovers Tetsujin 28, a giant robot left for him by his father (Hiroshi Abe). With the help of Chief Otsuka and classmate Mami Tachibana, Shotaro learns to control Tetsujin and does battle with the villainous Dr. Reiji Takumi and Black Ox.

Cancelled films
On December 26, 2008, Felix Ip, the creative director of Imagi Animation Studios, revealed screenshots from a computer-animated teaser trailer featuring Tetsujin and Black Ox. On January 9, 2009, the Japanese animation company Hikari Productions and Imagi launched the projects website, as well as the full teaser featuring Shotaro and Dr. Franken. The film was subsequently cancelled, along with several other projects, when Imagi went defunct in 2010.

Idlewild director Bryan Barber reportedly acquired the rights to Gigantor in 2011, with plans to adapt it into a feature film. The project never came to fruition, however, and no further developments have been made since.

Legacy
 The shotacon genre of Japanese fiction, which focuses on a sexual attraction to young boys, is said to be linked to Tetsujin 28-gos Shotaro as an early example of the archetypal boys the genre focuses on; indeed, the term "shotacon" is said to be short for "Shotaro Complex".
 Guillermo del Toro has cited the series as an influence on his movie Pacific Rim, depicting a series of battles between human-controlled giant robots and giant alien monsters.
 Shotaro's name was borrowed by Katsuhiro Otomo for the protagonist of his manga, Akira. He also borrowed the name Shikishima for the colonel and the name of Shikishima's son, Tetsuo, for the character Tetsuo Shima; he has stated in the Akira Club book that it could be said that Akira is based on Tetsujin 28-go (Akira himself is referred to as "No. 28" by the scientists experimenting on the espers).
 The U.S. edition of the show, Gigantor, was spoofed in Saturday Night Lives "Torboto" sketch.

References

External links

 
1956 manga
1960 Japanese television series debuts
1960 Japanese television series endings
1992 anime television series debuts
2013 anime television series debuts
2013 manga
Action anime and manga
Adventure anime and manga
Anime series based on manga
Dieselpunk
Eiken (studio)
Fuji TV original programming
Historical anime and manga
Japan-exclusive video games
Japanese television dramas based on manga
Manga adapted into films
Nippon TV original programming
Animated television series about robots
PlayStation 2 games
Science fiction anime and manga
Shōnen manga
Shueisha franchises
Shueisha manga
Super robot anime and manga
Video games based on anime and manga
Video games developed in Japan
World War II television series